This page details football records in Myanmar.

Most successful teams

Top-performing clubs - league structures

Myanmar National League

The Invincibles
Unbeatable champions:
 Shan United in 2022

MNL-2

Myanmar Womens League

Futsal League

Top-performing clubs - cup competitions

General Aung San Shield

Charity Cup

AFC Champions League

Participations

QS: Qualifying stage, G: Group round, R16: Round of 16, Q: Quarterfinals, S: Semifinal, R: Runner-up, W: Winner

AFC Cup

Participations

G: Group round, R16: Round 16, ZS: Zonal semi-finals, R: Runner-up, W: Winner

References

External links
 mnl 
 afccup 
 MFF  

Football in Myanmar
Association football records and statistics by country